Algeria and the Tunisia are members of the African Union, Arab League, Union for the Mediterranean and the United Nations.

Relations

Smaller and in a more precarious position vis-à-vis Libya, Tunisia has consistently made efforts to align with Algeria. In the 1970s, Tunisia reversed its position on the Western Sahara so as not to antagonize Algerian authorities. Tunisia was the first nation to sign the Treaty of Fraternity and Concord with Algeria, in 1983. Throughout Algeria's independent history, it has joined in a number of economic ventures with Tunisia, including the transnational pipeline running from Algeria through Tunisia to Italy. In 1987 the departure from power in Tunisia of President Habib Bourguiba and his replacement by the more diplomatic Zine el Abidine Ben Ali brought the two nations closer again.
After the Tunisian Revolution, when the Islamists represented by Ennahda Movement took the reins of power in Carthage, the relations between the two countries have become blurry after numerous accusations from Tunisian local voices and politicians to the Algerian regime and intelligence regarding the terrorist ambush on a Tunisian Army patrol close to the borders on Monday, 29 July 2013, which they claim happened due to Algeria's concerns of a revolution transfer from Tunisia and the need to destabilize the crispy internal security.
Tunisia's Internal Affairs minister said that Algeria was relieved that Tunisia was not going to export its revolution to them. They are both members of the African Union.

On December 14, president Beji Caed Essebsi visited Algeria on a fraternal visit. Algeria president, Boutaflika, has not visited Tunisia since 2012.

During the COVID-19 pandemic, Algeria closed land borders to Tunisia in 2020 to prevent the spread of the virus. On 6 July 2022, Algerian President Abdelmadjid Tebboune announced to reopen the borders on 15 July.

Resident diplomatic missions 
 Algeria has an embassy in Tunis and consulates in El Kef and Gafsa.
 Tunisia has an embassy in Algiers, a consulate-general in Annaba and a consulate in Tébessa.

References 

 
Tunisia 
Bilateral relations of Tunisia